Baker Lake Water Aerodrome  is located at Baker Lake, Nunavut, Canada.

See also
Baker Lake Airport

References

Registered aerodromes in the Kivalliq Region
Seaplane bases in Nunavut